Iron pentacarbonyl, also known as iron carbonyl, is the compound with formula . Under standard conditions Fe(CO)5 is a free-flowing, straw-colored liquid with a pungent odour.  Older samples appear darker.  This compound is a common precursor to diverse iron compounds, including many that are useful in small scale organic synthesis.

Properties
Iron pentacarbonyl is a homoleptic metal carbonyl, where carbon monoxide is the only ligand complexed with a metal.  Other examples include octahedral Cr(CO)6 and tetrahedral Ni(CO)4. Most metal carbonyls have 18 valence electrons, and Fe(CO)5 fits this pattern with 8 valence electrons on Fe and five pairs of electrons provided by the CO ligands.  Reflecting its symmetrical structure and charge neutrality, Fe(CO)5 is volatile; it is one of the most frequently encountered liquid metal complexes.  Fe(CO)5 adopts a trigonal bipyramidal structure with the Fe atom surrounded by five CO ligands: three in equatorial positions and two axially bound.  The Fe–C–O linkages are each linear.

Fe(CO)5 exhibits a relatively low rate of interchange between the axial and equatorial CO groups via the Berry mechanism. It is characterized by two intense νCO bands in the IR spectrum at 2034 and 2014 cm−1 (gas phase).

Synthesis and other iron carbonyls
Fe(CO)5 is produced by the reaction of fine iron particles with carbon monoxide.  The compound was described in a journal by Mond and Langer in 1891 as "a somewhat viscous liquid of a pale-yellow colour."  Samples were prepared by treatment of finely divided, oxide-free iron powder with carbon monoxide at room temperature.

Industrial synthesis of the compound requires relatively high temperatures and pressures (e.g. 175 atm at 150 °C) as well as specialized, chemically resistant equipment (e.g. composed of copper-silver alloys). Preparation of the compound at the laboratory scale avoids these complications by using an iodide intermediate:

 FeI2 + 4 CO → Fe(CO)4I2
 5 Fe(CO)4I2 + 10 Cu → 10 CuI + 4 Fe(CO)5 + Fe

Industrial production and use
The industrial production of this compound is somewhat similar to the Mond process in that the metal is treated with carbon monoxide to give a volatile gas. In the case of iron pentacarbonyl, the reaction is more sluggish. It is necessary to use iron sponge as the starting material, and harsher reaction conditions of 5–30 MPa of carbon monoxide and 150–200 °C. Similar to the Mond process, sulfur acts as a catalyst. The crude iron pentacarbonyl is purified by distillation. Ullmann's Encyclopedia of Industrial Chemistry reports that there are only three plants manufacturing pentacarbonyliron; BASF in Germany and GAF in Alabama have capacities of 9000 and 1500–2000 tonnes/year respectively.

Most iron pentacarbonyl produced is decomposed on site to give pure carbonyl iron in analogy to carbonyl nickel. Some iron pentacarbonyl is burned to give pure iron oxide. Other uses of pentacarbonyliron are small in comparison.

Reactions

Decarbonylation and related CO substitution reactions
Irradiation of Fe(CO)5 with UV produces Fe(CO)4, which captures a variety of ligands to give adducts.  In the absence of trapping substrates, Fe2(CO)9 is produced.

Many compounds are derived from Fe(CO)5 by substitution of CO by Lewis bases, L, to give derivatives Fe(CO)5−xLx.  Common Lewis bases include isocyanides,  tertiary phosphines and arsines, and alkenes.  Usually these ligands displace only one or two CO ligands, but certain acceptor ligands such as PF3 and isocyanides can proceed to tetra- and pentasubstitution.  These reactions are often induced with a catalyst or light.  Illustrative is the synthesis of the bis(triphenylphosphine)iron tricarbonyl complex (Fe(CO)3(P(C6H5)3)2).  In addition to the photochemical route, substitution can also induced by NaOH or NaBH4.  The catalyst attacks a CO ligand, which labilizes another CO ligand toward substitution.  The electrophilicity of Fe(CO)4L is less than that of Fe(CO)5, so the nucleophilic catalyst, disengages and attacks another molecule of Fe(CO)5.

Oxidation and reduction
Most metal carbonyls can be halogenated.  Thus, treatment of Fe(CO)5 with iodines gives iron tetracarbonyl diiodide: 
Fe(CO)5  +  I2  →  Fe(CO)4I2  +  CO

Reduction of Fe(CO)5 with Na gives Na2Fe(CO)4, "tetracarbonylferrate" also called Collman's reagent.  The dianion is isoelectronic with Ni(CO)4 but highly nucleophilic.

Acid-base reactions
Fe(CO)5 is not readily protonated, but it is attacked by hydroxide.  Treatment of Fe(CO)5 with aqueous base produces [HFe(CO)4]−, via the metallacarboxylate intermediate. The oxidation of this monoanion gives triiron dodecarbonyl, Fe3(CO)12.  Acidification of solutions of  [HFe(CO)4]− gives iron tetracarbonyl dihydride, H2Fe(CO)4.

Diene adducts
Dienes react with Fe(CO)5 to give (diene)Fe(CO)3, wherein two CO ligands have been replaced by two olefins.  Many dienes undergo this reaction, notably norbornadiene and 1,3-butadiene.  One of the more historically significant derivatives is cyclobutadieneiron tricarbonyl  (C4H4)Fe(CO)3, where C4H4 is the otherwise unstable cyclobutadiene.  Receiving the greatest attention are complexes of the cyclohexadienes, the parent organic 1,4-dienes being available through the Birch reductions.  1,4-Dienes isomerize to the 1,3-dienes upon complexation.

Fe(CO)5 reacts in dicyclopentadiene to form [Fe(C5H5)(CO)2]2, cyclopentadienyliron dicarbonyl dimer.  This compound, called "Fp dimer" can be considered a hybrid of ferrocene and Fe(CO)5, although in terms of its reactivity, it resembles neither.

CO substitution reactions 
Upon UV irradiation Fe(CO)5 absorbs light population and metal-to-CO charge transfer band inducing CO photolysis and generating singlet and triplet coordinatively unsaturated intermediate Fe(CO)4 with high quantum yield. Prolonged irradiation in gas phase may proceed to further CO detach until atomic Fe formation.

Other uses
In Europe, iron pentacarbonyl was once used as an anti-knock agent in petrol in place of tetraethyllead; it was produced by IG Farben and commercially marketed under the trade names, “Motolin” and “Monopolin”.  Two more modern alternative fuel additives are ferrocene and methylcyclopentadienyl manganese tricarbonyl.  Fe(CO)5 is used in the production of "carbonyl iron", a finely divided form of Fe, a material used in magnetic cores of high-frequency coils for radios and televisions and for manufacture of the active ingredients of some radar absorbent materials (e.g. iron ball paint). It is famous as a chemical precursor for the synthesis of various iron-based nanoparticles.

Iron pentacarbonyl has been found to be a strong flame speed inhibitor in oxygen based flames. A few hundred ppm of iron pentacarbonyl are known to reduce the flame speed of stoichiometric methane–air flame by almost 50%. However due to its toxic nature it has not been used widely as a flame retardant.

Toxicity and hazards
Fe(CO)5 is toxic, which is of concern because of its volatility (vapour pressure:  at 20 °C).  If inhaled, iron pentacarbonyl may cause lung irritation, toxic pneumonitis, or pulmonary edema.  Like other metal carbonyls, Fe(CO)5 is flammable. It is, however, considerably less toxic than nickel tetracarbonyl.

The National Institute for Occupational Safety and Health has set a recommended exposure limit for iron pentacarbonyl at 0.1 ppm (0.23 mg/m3) over an eight-hour time-weighted average, and a short-term exposure limit at 0.2 ppm (0.45 mg/m3).

References

Carbonyl complexes
Iron(0) compounds
Antiknock agents